Clitheroe Rural District was a rural district in the county of Lancashire, England. It was created in 1894 and abolished in 1974 under the Local Government Act 1972.

It was based on Clitheroe and included 16 other civil parishes.

It had a population of 5,838 in 1901 and 8,799 in 1961.

References

External links
Map of Clitheroe RD at Vision of Britain

History of Lancashire
Districts of England created by the Local Government Act 1894
Districts of England abolished by the Local Government Act 1972
Rural districts of England